Spiritual drunkenness refers to a phenomenon seen in some Christian denominations, particularly those associated with Pentecostalism and the Charismatic Movement, in which individuals who are said to be experiencing intense momentary visitations of—or even possession by—the Holy Spirit exhibit a range of behaviors resembling signs of moderate to severe alcoholic inebriation, including unsteadiness, uncontrollable laughter, silly expressions or gestures, verbal or nonverbal shouting (not typically in the form of glossolalia), sudden intense fatigue, and temporary unconsciousness. The phenomenon typically occurs during Pentecostal and charismatic church services, usually at the prompting of a preacher or pastor, and most often involving multiple members of a congregation at a time, generally after having been "transferred" from one person to another via respiratory blowing or laying on of hands. It also can occur at more intimate settings including housegroups and fellowship meetings of believers, wherever the Holy Spirit is free to move and have His way. The experiences are meant to bring people into a deeper encounter of God's love, power, presence and joy. The result should be a positive one, leading one to a more holy and joyous life.

The concept of spiritual drunkenness is controversial among non-Pentecostal denominations. Opponents cite a lack of explicit biblical description of anything resembling spiritual drunkenness, and some posit that the behaviors may even be the product of demonic influence.

The Bible however does liken being filled with the Holy Spirit to wine, “And be not drunk with wine, wherein is excess; but be filled with the Spirit." Ephesians 5:18
Acts 2:1-15 says 'When the day of Pentecost came, they were all together in one place. Suddenly a sound like a mighty rushing wind came from heaven and filled the whole house where they were sitting. They saw tongues like flames of fire that separated and came to rest on each of them. And they were all filled with the Holy Spirit and began to speak in other tongues as the Spirit enabled them. Now there were dwelling in Jerusalem God-fearing Jews from every nation under heaven. And when this sound rang out, a crowd came together in bewilderment, because each one heard them speaking his own language.

Astounded and amazed, they asked, “Are not all these men who are speaking Galileans? How is it then that each of us hears them in his own native language? Parthians, Medes, and Elamites; residents of Mesopotamia, Judea and Cappadocia, Pontus and Asia, Phrygia and Pamphylia, Egypt and the parts of Libya near Cyrene; visitors from Rome, both Jews and converts to Judaism; Cretans and Arabs—we hear them declaring the wonders of God in our own tongues!” Astounded and perplexed, they asked one another, “What does this mean?” But others mocked them and said, “They are drunk on new wine!”

Then Peter stood up with the Eleven, lifted up his voice, and addressed the crowd: “Men of Judea and all who dwell in Jerusalem, let this be known to you, and listen carefully to my words. These men are not drunk, as you suppose. It is only the third hour of the day!'

Those who have been 'drunk in the Holy Spirit' describe themselves as being overcome by God's presence and His love with the ability to speak in other tongues powerfully. Some report feeling like they have a new confidence and desire to preach to anyone about Jesus without any fear. The Holy Spirit's presence liberates them. This is because 'where the Spirit of the Lord is there is freedom' 2 Corinthians 3:17. The Holy Spirit has encountered them in a very powerful way. Many who get drunk in the Holy Spirit describe their relationship with Him becoming deeper and more fulfilling.

See also
 Slain in the Spirit
 Glossolalia
 Pentecostalism

References 

Charismatic and Pentecostal worship